Ofie Kodjoe is an American-Ghanaian singer, actress, radio presenter and motivational speaker.

Early life
Ofie was born in New York City to W.B. Ofuatey-Kodjoe, a political science professor, and Virginie Ofuatey-Kodjoe (Nee Coussey). The middle child of three, with sister Ayeki and Brother Nene (deceased), she received her primary school education in Queens, NY before returning with her family to Ghana, where she attended school at Aburi Girls Secondary School. She then moved back to the U.S. to pursue her tertiary education in New York.

Family life 
Ofie is a mother of two sons, Kaleb Kofi Forson from her first marriage, and Joseph Tetteh Ofuatey-Kodjoe from a previous relationship.

Music 
Ms. Kodjoe has been performing around the world for the past thirty years and has performed on such shows as BET’s “Walk of Fame” and “Celebration of Gospel”. She has been living her passion as a performing artist in Accra for the past six years and has made quite an impact on the Ghanaian music scene for the past three years and has performed all over Ghana and West Africa. Ofie has had the honour of performing for Otumfuo Osei Tutu II, the Asantehene; for President Sirleaf-Johnson of Liberia and Parliamentary audiences in both Ghana and Nigeria.

She’s shared the stage with some of Ghana’s greats including Gyedu Blay Ambolley, George Darko, Pat Thomas, and Kojo Antwi and has worked with some of the greatest producers and musicians in the Ghana Music Industry including as mentioned above Kwame Yeboah, Victor Dey Jr. and Alfed “Bibi” Duwona  Hammond Jr.,

On December 31, 2015 Ofie released her long-awaited CD, “The Essence,” a diverse blend of life-inspired songs that speak of living and loving life, the relationships we have with family, mankind and God. It speaks of love, gratitude and faith and to the importance of each. The album appeals to people of all ages and all walks of life.

Ms. Kodjoe has hosted her own music magazine show, “Jammin’@Tropicana”, which aired on eTV in 2011 and again in 2015. The show featured prominent musical guests on the Ghanaian music scene, but also offered a platform young and enthusiastic talent the opportunity to showcase their musical skills.  She also served as judge on the music reality show MTN HitMaker for the first three seasons. While there she took the opportunity to coach and mentor young artists on their careers as performing artists and more.

Type of music
 Jazz
 Neo soul
 R&B
 Gospel

Other roles
Ofie Kodjoe is also a motivational speaker and training facilitator, administering training in the areas of corporate, executive and performance management; personnel development and team building; PR and media management; and branding.

Ms. Ofie or Aunty Ofie, as she is referred to by her younger associates, has always been an advocate for youth development, and has over 25 years of training and development under her belt, so it is not a surprise that she has started using these skills to mentor young artistes and other young business visionaries. This past year Ofie began delivering seminars and workshops that focus on branding, developing ones talent and pursuing ones passion.

Ms. O, her radio persona, has served as a panelist on various radio shows on XYZ 93.1 FM; as Co-host on the Live Breakfast Club and host of The Upside and The Nightcap on Live 91.9 FM; and The Upside, midday show on 87.9 FM, Atlantis Radio.  .

She has also participated as mediator and facilitator in the High Vibes Women Music Workshop in October 2012. This was a capacity workshop that introduced young women musicians to the music industry and gave seasoned women musicians the opportunity to share their knowledge and advise on the industry. She’s also participated in the Global Music Icons Workshop, which took place this past March, where she delivered a seminar on artiste development, branding and management and The TedX SPintex Women's Event in Accra in December 2013.

Ofie Kodjoe is also an actress, appearing in Juliet Asante's Pan-African social drama, Silver Rain as Mrs. Timothy; and Shirley Frimpong-Manso's political drama series, Shampaign. She also played the role of Mrs. Lena Younger or Mama in the historical play, "A Raisin in The Sun" by African-American playwright Lorraine Hansberry.

Ofie started her involvement on radio when she became part of an ongoing guest panel on the relationship segment every Thursday morning on XYZ 93.1 FM. She continued, as radio personality Ms. O, on Live 91.9FM, where she was previously part of the team on the Live Breakfast Club every weekday morning,  and hosted her own shows, The Upside, and The Nightcap on Live 91.9FM and then on Atlantis Radio.

Social causes
Ofie is also an advocate on behalf of a number of social causes, namely  
 Little Big Souls, Africa, an international charitable organization committed to advancing the care, welfare and survival of pre-term babies born on the African continent. 
 Strands of Pearls International, a woman’s advocacy group that offers assistance to women in business and personal development.
 The Sophie’s Voice Foundation (SVF), a charitable organization established in 2008 to assist families of children struggling with spina bifida and other neural tube defects; 
 Basics International, an organization based in Chorkor, Accra, that is committed to eradicating child slavery and promoting literacy and education among the under-privileged youth in this low-income area of Accra; 
 Love Your World 5000’, a concert presented by PlanitGhana, which raised funds for autism awareness, education and support of The Autism Awareness Care and Training Centre in Ghana.

Awards
Ms. Kodjoe, along with other key women in entertainment and media, has been honored during the Ivana Elle Coutoure Fashion Celebrations in December 2010 and December 2011, for her accomplishments in music and entertainment, for her work on social issues and for being a positive role model in the world today.

References

Living people
Year of birth missing (living people)